Enzo Benedetto (10 November 1905 - 27 May 1993) was an Italian painter.

References

1905 births
1993 deaths
20th-century Italian painters
20th-century Italian male artists
Italian male painters